Ross Surgenor is a former NASCAR driver from Victoria, British Columbia. He competed in two Winston Cup races, both of which were in the 1974 season at Riverside International Raceway, the Winston Western 500 and Tuborg 400, finishing 12th in the Tuborg 400 in June. Surgenor also made six Winston West starts from 1974 to 1976.

External links
 Racing-Reference

Racing drivers from British Columbia
NASCAR drivers
Sportspeople from Victoria, British Columbia
Living people
Year of birth missing (living people)